This is a list of Members of Parliament (MPs) elected to the House of Commons of the United Kingdom by English constituencies for the Fifty-Sixth Parliament of the United Kingdom (2015-2017).

It includes both MPs elected at the 2015 general election, held on 7 May 2015, and those subsequently elected in by-elections.

The list is sorted by the name of the MP, and MPs who did not serve throughout the Parliament are italicised. New MPs elected since the general election are noted at the bottom of the page.

Composition

MPs in the East of England region

MPs in the East Midlands region

MPs in the London region

MPs in the North East region

MPs in the North West region

MPs in the South East region

MPs in the South West region

MPs in the West Midlands region

MPs in the Yorkshire and the Humber region

By-elections
 2015 Oldham West and Royton by-election
 2016 Sheffield Brightside and Hillsborough by-election
 2016 Ogmore by-election
 2016 Tooting by-election
 2016 Witney by-election
 2016 Batley and Spen by-election
 2016 Richmond Park by-election
 2016 Sleaford and North Hykeham by-election
 2017 Copeland by-election
 2017 Stoke-on-Trent Central by-election

See also
 2015 United Kingdom general election
 List of MPs elected in the 2015 United Kingdom general election
 List of MPs for constituencies in Scotland (2015–2017)
 List of MPs for constituencies in Northern Ireland (2015–2017)
 List of MPs for constituencies in Wales (2015–2017)
 :Category:UK MPs 2015–2017

References

England
2015-20
MPs